The 2014 South Australian National Football League (SANFL) was an Australian rules football competition. Norwood beat Port Adelaide by 82 to 78.

Teams

Scorecard

References 

SANFL Grand Finals
SANFL Grand Final, 2014